The England cricket team toured New Zealand between October and December 2019 to play two Tests and five Twenty20 International (T20I) matches. New Zealand Cricket confirmed the fixtures for the tour in June 2019. The Bay Oval hosted its first ever Test match, becoming the ninth Test venue in the country.

The Test matches were not part of the 2019–21 ICC World Test Championship (WTC), as the tour was confirmed prior to the formation of the WTC. Ashley Giles, the managing director of England men's cricket, suggested that the tour could have a stand-in captain and coach. However, when the squads were announced in September 2019, Joe Root and Eoin Morgan were retained as the captains of England's Test and T20I teams respectively, but Jonny Bairstow was dropped from the Test squad. Sam Billings was named as the vice-captain of England's T20I squad. In November 2019, Bairstow was added to England's Test squad, as cover for Joe Denly.

Kane Williamson was ruled out of T20I series due to a hip injury, with Tim Southee named as New Zealand's captain. New Zealand's Trent Boult was rested for the first three T20Is, in order to focus on his Test preparations.

The final T20I finished in a tie, with the match decided by a Super Over. England won the Super Over to win the T20I series 3–2. In the Test series, New Zealand won the first match by an innings and 65 runs. This stretched New Zealand's unbeaten run at home in Tests to ten matches, going back to March 2017, which includes wins in seven of those fixtures. New Zealand won the two-match Test series 1–0, after the second Test was drawn.

Squads

In New Zealand's T20I squad, Lockie Ferguson was selected for the first three matches, and Trent Boult was selected for the last two matches. Ahead of the second T20I, Joe Denly was ruled out of England's squad for the rest of the T20I series due to an ankle injury. Jonny Bairstow was added to England's Test squad as cover for Denly. Ahead of the first Test, Lockie Ferguson and Todd Astle were released from the New Zealand squad to participate in the Ford Trophy. Ahead of the second Test, both Trent Boult and Colin de Grandhomme were ruled out of New Zealand's squad due to injury. Daryl Mitchell was called up as cover for de Grandhomme, with Lockie Ferguson and Todd Astle also rejoining the New Zealand squad for the second Test.

Tour matches

20-over match: New Zealand XI vs England

20-over match: New Zealand XI vs England

Two-day match: New Zealand XI vs England

Three-day match: New Zealand A vs England

T20I series

1st T20I

2nd T20I

3rd T20I

4th T20I

5th T20I

Test series

1st Test

2nd Test

References

External links
 Series home at ESPN Cricinfo

2019 in English cricket
2019 in New Zealand cricket
International cricket competitions in 2019–20
2019-20